Antti Huusari (10 July 1898 – 16 February 1973) was a Finnish athlete. He competed in the men's decathlon at the 1924 Summer Olympics.

References

External links
 

1898 births
1973 deaths
People from Kouvola
People from Viipuri Province (Grand Duchy of Finland)
Athletes (track and field) at the 1924 Summer Olympics
Finnish decathletes
Olympic athletes of Finland
Olympic decathletes
Sportspeople from Kymenlaakso